This is a '''list of UTSA Roadrunners football players in the NFL Draft.

Key

Selections

References

UTSA

UTSA Roadrunners NFL Draft